Hydrophilus picicornis  is a species of water scavenger beetle belonging to the Hydrophilinae subfamily. This species occurs mostly in Indonesia and Australia.

References 

 Biolib
 Atlas of Living Australia

Hydrophilinae
Beetles described in 1863